Julián Villagrán Aguilar (born 24 May 1973) is a Spanish actor. He appeared in more than sixty films and television programs since 1997.

Selected filmography
Film

Television

Accolades

References

External links 

1973 births
Living people
Spanish male film actors
21st-century Spanish male actors